Tarhan may refer to:

 Tarhan District, administrative subdivision of Iran
 Tarhan Tower Airlines, charter airline based in Istanbul, Turkey
 Tarhan, Çorum, district in Turkey
 Tarhan (name), list of people with the name

See also
 Tarhana, Southeast European and Middle Eastern dried food made of grain, fermented yoghurt or fermented milk